The Institut Supérieur de l'Aéronautique et de l'Espace (ISAE-SUPAERO) is a French grande école of engineering, founded in 1909. It was the world's first dedicated aerospace engineering school and is considered to be the best in Europe in the field. The school delivers a range of science and engineering degree programs. ISAE-SUPAERO is part of University of Toulouse, ISSAT, PEGASUS, GEA, Toulouse Tech, CESAER and Aerospace Valley.

Historically ISAE-SUPAERO resulted from the merger between SUPAERO and ENSICA in the summer of 2007. The aim of this move was to increase the international visibility of SUPAERO and the ENSICA (both of which depend on the French Ministry of Defense), by sharing their faculty and experimental means. In 2011, ISAE founded Groupe ISAE with the engineering school, ENSMA. In 2012, Groupe ISAE was joined by ESTACA and by l’Ecole de l’Air.

The Institute also delivers continuing education through its subsidiary, EUROSAE.

Since its founding in 1909 ISAE-SUPAERO has produced more than 21,500 graduates. Some of them have achieved fame in their field, including: Henri Coandă, the discoverer of the Coandă effect; Henri Ziegler, father of the Airbus program; Frédéric d'Allest, first chairman of Arianespace; and Jean-François Clervoy, astronaut.

Mission
ISAE-SUPAERO has the following missions:
To educate engineers in the aeronautics and space fields and in related areas.
To engage in scientific research and technological innovation.
To deliver specialized graduate education and continuing education programs.
To deliver doctoral programs and national degrees equivalent or superior to the master's degree.

Legal status and organization
ISAE was created by decree 2007-1384 of 24 September 2007.

Under the auspices of the Ministry of Defence, and overseen by the DGA (the French Government Defence procurement agency), the Institute is a public institution with a scientific, cultural, and professional vocation. It is governed by articles R.3411-1 to R.3411-28 of the Defence Code and is accredited by the Engineering Education Commission. ISAE SUPAERO also delivers national Doctorate and master's degrees and Advanced master's degrees accredited by la Conférence des Grandes Ecoles, an organization whose members are the most prestigious business and engineering schools in France.

The Institute is governed by an Executive Board of 27 members, headed by the President. The Board meets three times a year. The Institute also has an educational board, a research board, and a continuing education board Members of the advisory boards come from within the Institute and academia and industry.

ISAE-SUPAERO has implemented an ISO 9001 quality management system (2008 version) for all of its activities (education, research and support).

History

History of ENSAE (École Nationale Supérieure de l'Aéronautique et de l'Espace, or the National School of Aeronautics and Space) or "SupAéro"

The historic logo of the former SUPAERO school: the owl, associated with the Greek Goddess, Athena, is a symbol of knowledge. Today, the owl is still part of the ISAE-SUPAERO logo.

In 1909, Colonel Jean-Baptiste Roche, a civil engineering officer and a graduate of l’Ecole Polytechnique, had the foresight and vision to anticipate the needs and future scope of the aeronautics industry in the world and founded the l'École Supérieure d'Aéronautique et de Constructions Mécaniques, or the Higher School of Aeronautics and Mechanical Construction in Paris.

In 1930, the school was later renamed "l’Ecole Nationale Supérieure de l’Aéronautique", under the leadership of the French engineer, Albert Caquot, and in 1972 it became l’Ecole Nationale Supérieure de l’Aeronautique et de l’Espace, or the Higher School of Aeronautics and Space, better known as “SUPAERO”. Also in 1930, the School moved to more modern buildings in « la Cité de l’Air », located boulevard Victor in Paris.

In 1968, SUPAERO moved to the vast aerospace hub of Toulouse-Lespinet, in the heart of a stimulating higher education and research environment, right near l’Ecole Nationale de l’Aviation Civile, the School of Civil Aviation (ENAC), which was also transferred to Toulouse the same year. In 1970, the former Paris premises of the School were home to l'École Nationale Supérieure de Techniques Avancées (ENSTA ParisTech or the Higher School of Advanced Techniques), until the latter moved to new premises on the campus of École Polytechnique in Palaiseau. They were transformed into the Conference Center of the Ministry of Defence.

Several research laboratories were created in affiliation with the School and regrouped around the Toulouse ONERA center. Today, affiliated with the School, it conducts theoretical and applied research in defence in a wide range of fields including aerodynamics, automatic control, advanced robotics, aerospace electronics, computer systems, aerospace vehicles, aerospace mechanics, and propulsive systems.

In 1975, SUPAERO was one of the first engineering schools in France to be accredited to deliver the doctoral degree.

In 1994, SUPAERO became a public body with legal personality reporting to the Ministry of Defence. In practice, the Institute is overseen by the DGA, Directorate General of Armaments (French Defence procurement agency) and under the direction of an “ingénieur général de l'armement”.

History of ENSICA (École nationale supérieure d'ingénieurs de constructions aéronautiques) 

ENSICA was created in Paris at the time of the Liberation, under the name, " École nationale des travaux aéronautiques " (ENTA or the National School of Aeronautical Construction), in accordance with article 8 of the law on finance of 1946. The first graduating class included 25 students who would join the military corps of engineers specialized in aeronautics.

By decree of June 4, 1957, the school's name was changed to “l’École nationale d’ingénieurs des constructions aéronautiques (ENICA or the National School of Aeronautics Engineers). The degree program was extended to three years with a new focus on industry and a larger share of civilian students.

In 1961, ENICA was relocated to Toulouse. Under the leadership of the Director, Émile Blouin, the School acquired its own identity and a new dimension. The geographic link was cut with SUPAERO, which until then had housed the school on its premises, Boulevard Victor, in Paris. The building of a new student center on campus helped create a cohesive identity and bring together the different graduating classes.

In 1969, the School was affiliated with the common competitive exam for the top ranking engineering schools (ENSI). In 1979, the school was honored with the Medal of Aeronautics, awarded by the Engineer General of Armaments, Georges Bousquet. The same year, the School became known as l’école nationale supérieure d’ingénieurs de constructions aéronautiques (ENSICA or the Higher National School of Aeronautics Construction Engineers).

Creation of ISAE in 2007 

In 2007, ENSAE SupAéro merged with ENSICA to create a single institution: l'Institut supérieur de l'aéronautique et de l'espace, or ISAE which brings together the two former schools’ resources and facilities in one common organization. 
In 2015, the ingénieur ISAE-SUPAERO degree program gave its name to the all school, which became ISAE-SUPAERO.
As of the summer of 2015, all of the Institute's facilities are now located together on the Rangueil campus.

Academics 

The Institute delivers the following educational programs:

The ingénieur ISAE-SUPAERO program,
The joint CNAM-ISAE apprenticeship or co-op program,
An International Masters Program in Aerospace Engineering,
6 Research Masters Programs,
15 Advanced Masters Programs,
6 Doctoral schools,
Continuing education programs.

Students accepted into the ingénieur ISAE-SUPAERO program are selected on the basis of their results on the Mines-Ponts competitive exam common to the most selective engineering schools in France. Since 2015, the Institute has been educating these students within the framework of a new common ISAE-SUPAERO engineering curriculum.

ISAE-SUPAERO is a school of application of l’Ecole Polytechnique and in particular it trains engineers of the armaments corps. It also trains military engineers with an aeronautics specialization once the latter have completed a first year at another French engineering school, ENSTA Bretagne, in Brest, France.

In 2011, ISAE founded Groupe ISAE with the engineering school, ENSMA.  In 2012, Groupe ISAE was joined by ESTACA and by l’Ecole de l’Air.

The Institute also delivers continuing education through its subsidiary, EUROSAE.

National rankings and acceptance rates 

National ranking (ranked for its Master of Sciences in Engineering)

ISAE-SUPAERO is one of the most selective engineering school in France with acceptance rates below 10%.

The undergraduate admission to ISAE-SUPAERO in the engineer cycle is made through two ways: the first pathway by which most students are recruited, is a very selective examination which requires at least two years of very intensive preparation after high school in classes préparatoires. The other pathway corresponds to the recruitment of about twenty undergraduate students from universities. For both ways, admission includes a week of written examinations during the spring followed by oral examinations that are handled in batches (séries) over the summer.

About only 200 students from classes préparatoires or French universities are admitted to the prestigious school each year.

The average acceptance rates of the national examination taken by students from classes préparatoires are indicated below:

ISAE-SUPAERO (ENSICA and SUPAERO) alumni 
Notable alumni include:

 Raoul Badin, S-1910, one of the main inventors of the airspeed indicator and forefather of instrument flying.
 Henri Coandă, S-1910, discovered the Coandă Effect; Romanian designer of the first jet plane.
 Henry Potez, S-1911, founder of the Potez airplanes company.
 Mikhail Gurevich, S-1913, founder of MiG 
 Marcel Bloch-Dassault, S-1913, founder of the Dassault airplanes company.
 René Couzinet, S-1925, aircraft designer, conceived the Couzinet 30 Arc-en-Ciel, the famous plane flown by Jean Mermoz, and also invented the retractable landing gear and the modern yoke.
 Henri Ziegler, S-1931, father of the Airbus program.
 Guy du Merle, S-1932, first director-general of the École nationale de l'aviation civile (French civil aviation university).
 François Hussenot, S-1935, inventor of the "hussenographe" (an early form of Flight data recorder or "black box"); also involved in the creation of EPNER.
 Jean-Claude Laprie (1944-2010), E-1968,director of research at the CNRS, former director of the LAAS-CNRS, silver medal of CNRS.
 Serge Dassault, S-1951, CEO of Dassault Aviation.
 Jacques Darricau, E-1961, an internationally recognized radar specialist, former president of EUROSAE and director of the SAE.
 Daniel Ferbeck, S-1963, creator of VAL (automated metro subway system).
 Eric Hayat, S-1964, Founder of STERIA.
 Louis Le Portz, E-1964, Former commissary general of Paris Air Show, former CEO of Thomson Training & Simulation (1994-1998).
 Francis Bernard, E-1965, first CEO of Dassault Systèmes.
 Frédéric d'Allest, S-1966, first chairman of Arianespace.
 Seddik Belyamani, E-1967, MS MIT, Former Executive Vice President of Boeing. (1998-2002)
 Rachid BenMokhtar Benabdellah, E-1967, Minister of National Education of Morocco (1995-1998 and since 2013).
 Jean Laurent, S-1967, Former CEO of Crédit Agricole and Chairman & CEO of Crédit Lyonnais.
 Bernard Ramanantsoa, S-1971, Director of HEC Paris (1996-2015).
 Philippe Wallet, E-1973, Director Aircraft Engineering and Maintenance, Air France.
 Serge Massart, E-1975, Special adviser to the CEO of EDF, former Director of the Nuclear Engineering Division then Director of Nuclear Operations.
 Jean-Paul Herteman, S-1975, former CEO of Safran.
 Alain Pechon, E-1977, Founder and former CEO of Sun Microsystems France. 
 Charles Champion, S-1978, Senior VP Engineering Airbus.
 Marie-Laure Roux, E-1981, Director of the Toulouse St Eloi factory of Airbus since 2011.
 Jean-François Clervoy, S-1983, astronaut.
 Alain Bellemare, E-1985, MBA McGill 93, CEO of Bombardier, Ex-CEO of Pratt & Whitney Canada.
 Marc Guinot, E-1985, Vice President A380 Chief Engineer, Airbus.
 Jean Kayanakis, E-1986, Chief executive of Dassault Falcon Services.
 Marwan Lahoud, S-1989, Chief Strategy and Marketing Officer of Airbus Group.
 Christophe Robin, E-1991, Technical director of Daher-Socata, Founder of DynAero an aeronautical construction company.
 Diego Diaz, E-1992, MS MIT, MBA MIT Sloan, Vice President of SNCF International.
 Guillaume Faury, S-1992, current CEO of  Airbus Group and former president of  Airbus Commercial Aircraft.
 Thomas Pesquet, S-2001, astronaut.
 Samantha Cristoforetti, S 2007 (ERASMUS), astronaut.
 Luca Parmitano, M-I-2009, astronaut.
 Vincent Lecrubier, S-2011, Olympic Games 2008-2012, Kayak Champion.
 Pascal Vasselon, 2000-2004 Michelin Competition, Director F1, since 2010 Toyota MotorsportGmbH, Technical Director

See also
 List of aerospace engineering schools

Notes and references

External links
ISAE-SUPAERO website 
SUPAERO alumni association

Aviation schools in France
Toulouse Institute of Technology
University of Toulouse
Aronautique
Aronautique
Aronautique
Aronautique
Educational institutions established in 2007
2007 establishments in France